Tasik Prima is a township in Petaling District, Selangor, Malaysia. It is a  township with a  resort lake, comprises linked houses, bungalows, semi-detached houses, condominiums, shopoffices and amenities. It is located within close proximity of IOI Mall, TESCO, GIANT and JUSCO Hypermarket in Puchong. It lies within the Multimedia Super Corridor (MSC) and is accessible to the major highways and expressways in the Klang Valley.

Access to Tasik Prima is made convenient via Lebuhraya Damansara-Puchong (LDP), Lebuhraya Bukit Jalil and Shah Alam Expressway (Kesas Highway). It is neighboring to housing estates such as Puchong Utama, Puchong Perdana, Puchong Tekali, and Puchong Prima.

Townships in Selangor